Porin Ässät (Finnish for Pori Aces) was a football club from Pori, Finland. It was established in 1967 as two local sports clubs Karhut and RU-38 merged. The football section was dissolved in 1981 and today Ässät is known as an ice hockey club.

Ässät played two seasons in the Finnish premier division Mestaruussarja (1968, 1969) and two seasons in the second tier Suomensarja (1970, 1971). In 1970 Ässät won the U-19 Finnish Championship title.

History

Founding of Porin Ässät

Ässät was established in 1967 when two clubs from Pori, Porin Karhut and RU-38, merged. The ice hockey team of Ässät got Karhut's place in the SM-sarja, while the Ässät's football team inherited RU-38's place in the Mestaruussarja. The Karhut football team continued its activities for one more season as Ässät's secondary team in Suomensarja, the second-tier league of Finland at the time.

Ässät in the Premier League 

Ässät played its first two seasons in the Mestaruussarja, the Premier League of Finland. Ässät got relegated to II Divisioona at the end of the 1969 season and never got promoted to the top-tier again.

Season to season

2 seasons in Mestaruussarja
10 season in II Divisioona
2 season in III Divisioona

Honors

II Divisioona 
 Western Group winner (1): 1973 (promotion playoff),

 Western Group runner-up (1): 1974,

III Divisioona 
 Group 3 winner (1): 1972 (promoted), 

 Group 3 runner-up (1): 1979 (promoted),

A-junior 
 Finnish Championship (1): 1970

See also 
Ässät Hockey

References 

Football clubs in Finland
Association football clubs established in 1967
Association football clubs disestablished in 1981
Sport in Pori
Ässät